The Farmer's Daughter is a 1940 American comedy film directed by James P. Hogan and written by Lewis R. Foster. The film stars Martha Raye, Charlie Ruggles, Richard Denning, Gertrude Michael, William Frawley, Inez Courtney and William Demarest. The film was released on March 26, 1940, by Paramount Pictures.

Plot
Nickie North, a producer, and Scoop Trimble, a press agent, find an investor for their film, who insists that they cast the producer's ex-girlfriend Clarice Sheldon, as the lead. After Sheldon finds out North has a new girlfriend, she leaves, leaving the producer to find a new lead actress.

Cast
Martha Raye as Patience Bingham
Charlie Ruggles as Nickie North
Richard Denning as Dennis Crane
Gertrude Michael as Clarice Sheldon
William Frawley as Scoop Trimble
Inez Courtney as Emily French
William Demarest as Victor Walsh
Jack Norton as Shimmy Conway
William Duncan as Tom Bingham
Ann Shoemaker as Mrs. Bingham
Benny Baker as Monk Gordon
Tom Dugan as Forbes
Lorraine Krueger as Valerie
Sheila Ryan as Dorinda 
Anne Harrison as Rosalie

References

External links 
 

1940 films
1940s English-language films
American comedy films
1940 comedy films
Paramount Pictures films
American black-and-white films
Films directed by James Patrick Hogan
1940s American films